Spiralizoros magnicaudelli is a species of insect in the order Zoraptera. It was first found in Malaysia.

This species was formerly a member of the genus Zorotypus.

References

Further reading
Dallai, R., et al. "Divergent mating patterns and a unique mode of external sperm transfer in Zoraptera: an enigmatic group of pterygote insects."Naturwissenschaften 100.6 (2013): 581–594.

External links

Zoraptera
Insects of Malaysia